Spodnji Log is a village on the right bank of the Sava River in the Municipality of Litija in central Slovenia. The area is included with the rest of the municipality in the Central Sava Statistical Region. Traditionally, it was part of the Lower Carniola region.

A covered bridge, built in 1935, stands east of the settlement. It crosses the Sava River to the village of Sava.

References

External links
Spodnji Log on Geopedia

Populated places in the Municipality of Litija